Central ǃKung (Central ǃXun), or Central Ju, is a language of the ǃKung dialect cluster, spoken in a small area of northern Namibia: Neitsas, in Grootfontein district, and Gaub, in Tsumeb district. It is frequently reported as Grootfontein ǃXuun, as most work has been done in Grootfontein. An identifying feature of Central ǃKung is a fifth series of clicks that are often retroflex. While Northern (Northwestern) and Southern (Southeastern) ǃKung are not mutually intelligible, it is not yet clear to what extent Central ǃKung is intermediate between them or intelligible with either.

Dialects
Two dialects are identified as being Central ǃKung based on grammatical features:

(C1) Gaub (Tsumeb district, N Namibia)
(C2) Neitsas (Grootfontein district, N Namibia)

In addition, the ǃKung dialects of Tsintsabis, Leeunes and Mangetti (different from Mangetti Dune) have retroflex clicks and so may belong here, though no grammatical information is available to classify them.

In Grootfontein ǃKung words which Doke (1926) and others have described as having retroflex clicks, Vedder (1910/1911) described a second series of lateral clicks in Gaub ǃKung.

Phonology

Grootfontein ǃKung is unusual in having true retroflex clicks, which are subapical for some speakers and have lateral release, as in the word for 'water',  (provisionally written g‼ú). There are thus five places of articulation in Grootfontein clicks, . These come in eight series, here represented with the retroflex articulation:
Lingual , glottalized , linguo-pulmonic , linguo-glottalic 
Otherwise, the Grootfontein inventory is similar to that of Ekoka ǃKung, except that it lacks the (pre)voiced affricates .

The Grootfontein ǃKung language has a relatively large phonological inventory:

Consonants

Vowels 
The sounds may be articulated with nasalisation , breathy voice , or pharyngealisation . Some nasal vowels with diacritics may have combinations such as breathy + nasal , and pharyngeal + nasal .

Sample

Following are sample sentences in Central ǃKung.

mí má kȍhà hŋ́ gǀȕì ō ǁȁhìn-ā ō hȁ ō gǀè gù ǀxūúnnu

I must see the hyena to tell it to come catch the crocodile lying there

mtícē kwá bà ǀōā kē gǀè-ā g‼ȍhò

why didn't you come to work?

hȁ má kò kē ǁȁn̏ kú cŋ̏ djūí kā hȁ ǁàȅ-ā tí kē TB ǁ'à-ān tí

he was not supposed to drink beer anymore because he had tuberculosis [lit. he was held by TB sickness]

hȁ má kò ǁáúlè ǃxō

he is supposed to hunt elephants but he didn't

mí má kā ǁàȅ nǃùm̀ kā ŋ̄ŋ̀ kā-è cālā n‼á'm̀ g‼à è-tcā

I hold this rock so that it cannot fall down and kill us.

References

Further reading
 Amanda Miller, 2011. "The Representation of Clicks". In Oostendorp et al. eds., The Blackwell Companion to Phonology.''
 Miller, Sands, et al., 2010. "Retroflex Clicks in Two Dialects of ǃXung" (Grootfontein and Ekoka)
 Amanda Miller, 2009. "Contrastive Coronal Click Types in ǃXung" (Grootfontein)

External links
Grootfontein ǃKung basic lexicon at the Global Lexicostatistical Database

Kx'a languages